The Lively class were a successful class of sixteen British Royal Navy 38-gun sailing frigates.

Origins
The Lively class were a series of sixteen ships built to a 1799 design by Sir William Rule, which served in the Royal Navy during the Napoleonic Wars. In contemporary usage the class was referred to as the 'Repeat Lively class'. As such the prototype ship was not considered to be part of the class at the time.

They were considered the most successful British frigate design of the period, much prized by the Navy Board; after the prototype was launched in 1804 (by which time four more frigates had already been ordered to the same design), a further eleven sister-ships were ordered to her design, although this was slightly modified (in 1805) to have the gangways between forecastle and quarterdeck more integrated into the upperworks, a step towards the final enclosure of the waist. This was reinforced in 1809 by the abandonment of breastworks at the break of the quarterdeck and forecastle and in 1810 by the narrowing of the waist by the addition of gratings inboard of the gangways. At the same date, 'top riders', angled reinforcing timbers for the upperworks, were discontinued.

Characteristics and performance
The captain's reports on the performance of this class were remarkable for their absence of serious criticism. The vessels of the class were fast, recording 13kts large and 10-11kts close-hauled, weatherly and manoeuvrable. They were excellent heavy-weather ships, perfectly able to cope with a "head sea." They stowed their provisions well; they were capable of stowing provisions and fresh water for up to six months of cruising. Indeed, "riding light," after a substantial proportion of fresh water and provisions had been consumed, affected their sailing qualities adversely, so that most captains filled any emptied freshwater stowage capacity with seawater.

Ships in class 
 
 Builder: Woolwich Dockyard
 Ordered: 15 October 1799
 Laid down: November 1801
 Launched: 23 July 1804
 Completed: 27 August 1804
 Fate: Wrecked off Malta on 10 August 1810.
 
 Builder: Charles Ross, Rochester
 Ordered: 7 November 1803
 Laid down: March 1804
 Launched: 10 August 1805
 Completed: 19 October 1805 at Chatham Dockyard.
 Fate: Broken up April 1858 at Chatham Dockyard.
 
 Builder: George Parsons, Bursledon.
 Ordered: 7 November 1803
 Laid down: April 1804
 Launched: 27 June 1805
 Completed: 26 September 1805 at Portsmouth Dockyard.
 Fate: Broken up October 1856 at Portsmouth Dockyard.
 
 Builder: Balthasar & Edward Adams, Bucklers Hard.
 Ordered: 7 November 1803
 Laid down: March 1806
 Launched: 23 April 1807
 Completed: 27 June 1807 at Portsmouth Dockyard.
 Fate: Burnt by accident 1861 at Shoeburyness.
 
 Builder: Woolwich Dockyard
 Ordered: 7 November 1803 from Joseph Graham at Harwich; this builder became bankrupt in 1806 and the contract was transferred to Woolwich Dockyard on 6 January 1806.
 Laid down: April 1806
 Launched: 17 October 1807
 Completed: 2 December 1807
 Fate: Broken up at Portsmouth in December 1860.
 
 Builder: Robert Guillaume, Northam, Southampton.
 Ordered: 4 June 1805
 Laid down: December 1805
 Launched: 7 July 1807
 Completed: 26 August 1807 at Portsmouth Dockyard.
 Fate: Wrecked off Cuba on 26 February 1815.
 
 Builder: George Parsons, Bursledon.
 Ordered: 15 June 1805
 Laid down: July 1805
 Launched: 23 April 1807
 Completed: 4 August 1807 at Portsmouth Dockyard.
 Fate: Sold to break up 1861 at Charlton.
 
 Builder: Charles Ross, Rochester
 Ordered: 24 August 1805
 Laid down: October 1805
 Launched: 16 August 1806
 Completed: 6 October 1806 at Chatham Dockyard.
 Fate: Broken up April 1822 at Plymouth Dockyard.
 
 Builder: Plymouth Dockyard
 Ordered: 28 September 1808
 Laid down: November 1808
 Launched: 17 April 1810
 Completed: 21 June 1810 at Plymouth Dockyard.
 Fate: Sold 10 May 1897 to be broken up.
 
 Builder: Plymouth Dockyard
 Ordered: 28 September 1808
 Laid down: December 1808
 Launched: 3 April 1810
 Completed: 15 June 1810 at Plymouth Dockyard.
 Fate: Broken up at Plymouth September 1822.
 
 Builder: Woolwich Dockyard
 Ordered: 28 September 1808
 Laid down: May 1809
 Launched: 2 June 1810
 Completed: 6 July 1810 at Chatham Dockyard
 Fate: Captured by United States 25 October 1812. Broken up 1834.
 
 Builder: Woolwich Dockyard
 Ordered: 28 September 1808
 Laid down: September 1809
 Launched: 11 December 1810
 Completed: 2 February 1811
 Fate: Sold to be broken up 1854.
 
 Builder: Deptford Dockyard
 Ordered: 12 June 1809
 Laid down: July 1810
 Launched: 16 March 1811
 Completed: 25 January 1812
 Fate: Broken up 1858.
 
 Builder: George Parsons, Warsash.
 Ordered: 14 December 1810
 Laid down: January 1811 as HMS Nereide (renamed later that year)
 Launched: 13 April 1812
 Completed: 22 June 1812 at Portsmouth Dockyard
 Fate: Broken up 1875.
 
 Builder: Richard Blake & John Tyson, Bursledon.
 Ordered: 14 December 1810
 Laid down: September 1811
 Launched: 11 September 1813
 Completed: 29 September 1815 at Portsmouth Dockyard
 Fate: Broken up 1862.
 
 Builder: John Parsons & John Rubie, Warsash.
 Ordered: 21 March 1812
 Laid down: July 1812
 Launched: 31 May 1813
 Completed: 13 September 1813 at Portsmouth Dockyard
 Fate: Sold to be broken up 1885.

References

Bibliography
 Robert Gardiner, The Heavy Frigate, Conway Maritime Press, London 1994.
Gardiner, Robert (2000) Frigates of the Napoleonic Wars, Chatham Publishing, London.
 Rif Winfield, British Warships in the Age of Sail, 1714–1792, Seaforth Publishing, Barnsley 2007. .
 Rif Winfield, British Warships in the Age of Sail, 1793–1817, 2nd edition, Seaforth Publishing, Barnsley 2008. .

Frigates of the Royal Navy
Ship classes of the Royal Navy
Lively class